This is a list of Iranian officials with their titles.

Heads
Ali Khamenei, Supreme Leader
Ebrahim Raisi, President
Mohammad Bagher Ghalibaf, Speaker of the Parliament
Gholam-Hossein Mohseni-Eje'i, Chief Justice
Ahmad Jannati, Secretary of the Guardian Council and Chairman of the Assembly of Experts
Sadeq Larijani, Chairman of the Expediency Discernment Council

Vice presidents
 Mohammad Mokhber, First Vice President
 Mohammad Eslami, Vice President and Head of Atomic Energy Organization
 Rouhollah Dehghani  Firouzabadi, Vice President and Head of National Elites Foundation
 Ali Salajegheh, Vice President and Head of Department of Environment

Council of Ministers
Javad Sadatinejad, Minister of Agriculture Jihad
Reza Fatemi Amin, Minister of Industry, Mine and Trade
Issa Zarepour, Minister of Information and Communications Technology
Sowlat Mortazavi, Minister of Cooperatives, Labour, and Social Welfare
Mohammad Mehdi Esmaili, Minister of Culture and Islamic Guidance
Mohammad-Reza Gharaei Ashtiani, Minister of Defence and Armed Forces Logistics
Ehsan Khandozi, Minister of Economic Affairs and Finance
Yousef Nouri, Minister of Education
Ali Akbar Mehrabian, Minister of Energy
Hossein Amir-Abdollahian, Minister of Foreign Affairs 
Bahram Eynollahi, Minister of Health and Medical Education
Hamid Sajjadi, Minister of Sport and Youth
Esmaeil Khatib, Minister of Intelligence
Ahmad Vahidi, Minister of Interior
Amin Hossein Rahimi, Minister of Justice
Javad Owji, Minister of Petroleum
Mehrdad Bazrpash, Minister of Roads and Urban Development
Mohammad Ali Zolfigol, Minister of Science, Research and Technology
Ezzatollah Zarghami, Minister of Cultural Heritage, Handicrafts and Tourism

Other members of cabinet
Ali Bahadori Jahromi, Government Spokesman
Mohammad-Reza Farzin, Governor of the Central Bank of Iran

Other
Mehdi Chamran, Chairman of the City Council of Tehran
Ali Shamkhani, Secretary of the Supreme National Security Council
Alireza Zakani, Mayor of Tehran
Peyman Jebelli, Head of IRIB
Saeed Iravani, Representative to the United Nations

See also
 List of Iranian ambassadors under President Khatami
 List of Iranian provincial governors under President Khatami
 List of Iranians
 List of mayors of Tehran
 List of presidents of Iran

External links
Iran-NDE Chiefs of State and Cabinet Members, CIA

Officials
Iranian
Officials